Mohsen Yousefi (born 26 May 1954) is an Iranian retired association footballer. He has played for Iran national football team twice, scoring a goal against Saudi Arabia.

References 

1954 births
Living people
Iran international footballers
Iranian footballers
Rah Ahan players
Association football midfielders